"300" (the exact machine name includes the quotation marks) is a pinball machine designed by Ed Krynski and produced by Gottlieb with a bowling theme. The title is a reference to a perfect game in the sport, in which a bowler scores 300 points. A two-player version of this four-player game was released as Top Score.

Description
Gottlieb sold this game design in the two varieties, though they are essentially exactly the same game (with slight artwork differences). The two-player version (Top Score) had a lower price than the four-player ("300"), and was targeted to game operators with a smaller budget. This game used animated backbox red (bowling) balls for the bonus unit. Two kickout holes, two pop bumpers, one spinner, one slingshots, and two 3" flippers. It has the same right side lane scoring as Gottlieb Sheriff pinball (1971), and similar left side score as Gottlieb Super Soccer. Only a couple Gottlieb pinball games made during the 1970s used a backbox animation. The game has the same mechanical backbox animation as Super Soccer pinball. They made 7925 Gottlieb "300" pinball machines, and 3200 Gottlieb Top Score pinball machines.

Current Projects
At the Institute of Control Engineering of the Helmut-Schmidt-University / University of the Federal Armed Forces Hamburg, a Gottlieb 300 has been modified such that it can played by a computer. The ball is detected by a motion capture system and the flippers are operated by servo motors. The aim of the project is to investigate various strategies and algorithms for controlling the flippers with regard to the playing time and the point gain. A high repeat accuracy, with which the ball is shot up by the flippers, is thereby of central importance and at the same time the biggest challenge, since there are big tolerances with respect to the dynamic behavior due to the old electro-mechanical system.

References

External links
 Internet Pinball Database entry for "300"
 Internet Pinball Database entry for Top Score
 Webpage of the Institute of Control Engineering of the Helmut-Schmidt-University

1975 pinball machines
Gottlieb pinball machines